Baihe District is a district located in Tainan, Taiwan. It is known for its hot springs and lotus farming. The town borders Chiayi County to the north and east, Dongshan District to the south, and Houbi District to the west. Some indigenous Siraya people live here, although their lifestyles and traditions were almost replaced (or perhaps were absorbed) by Han Chinese culture.

History 

In 1875, Scottish missionary William Campbell made a narrow escape from an attack led by Gaw-chi-ko (吳志高), a wealthy local clan head opposed to the establishment of the foreign church. At the time, the place was a market-town called Tiam-a-khau (店仔口) and was five miles west of their chapel.

After the handover of Taiwan from Japan to the Republic of China in 1945, Baihe was organized as an urban township of Tainan County. On 25 December 2010, Tainan County was merged with Tainan City and Baihe was upgraded to a district of the city.

Administrative divisions 
Baihe, Yongan, Waijiao, Zhuangnei, Xiuyou, Hetung, Hushan, Dalin, Kantou, Liuxi, Guanling, Xiancao, Yufeng, Dazhu, Zhaoan, Guangan, Liantan, Zhumen, Qinei, Shengan, Biantou, Neijiao, Caodian and Ganzhai Village.

Tourist attractions 
 49 Thicket
 Baihe Lotus Park (白河蓮花公園)
 Baihe Night Market
 Baihe Reservoir
 Guangji Temple Hua'an Shrine
 Guanziling Hot Spring
 Lotus Park
 Small South China Sea Scenic Area
 Zhumen Green Tunnel

Transportation
Baihe is served by Freeway 3, and City Routes 165, 172, 172A, and 172B.

References

External links 

 

Districts of Tainan